Ethiopian crosses, Abyssinian crosses, or Ethiopian-Eritrean crosses are a grouping of Christian cross variants that are symbols of Christianity in Ethiopia, Eritrea, and among Ethiopians and Eritreans. Their elaborate, stylized design is markedly distinct from other Christian cross variants . Ethiopian crosses are almost always made from elaborate latticework, the intertwined lattice represents everlasting life. No two crosses are exactly identical in style, the artisans who make them being allowed the freedom to exercise a measure of individual taste and creativity in their choice of shape and pattern. Crosses may be of the processional type with a socket at the base so they may be mounted on a staff and carried in church ceremonies or hand-held blessing crosses used by priests in benedictions.

Gallery

See also
Lalibela Cross
Lithuanian cross crafting
Coptic cross
Khachkars, Armenian cross stones
Celtic crosses
mequamia

References

Ethiopian culture
Eritrean culture
Christianity in Ethiopia
Christianity in Eritrea
Crosses by culture